The A585 is a primary road in England which runs from Kirkham to Fleetwood in Lancashire.

The road runs a total distance of just under , on a mixture of rural and urban residential/commercial streets.  The  section north of the M55 formerly carried large amounts of container traffic to and from the Fleetwood container port, until operations ceased in 2010.

Route
The road continues as Fleetwood Road in a roughly northerly direction for a further , through Esprick and Greenhalgh. This section is rural and fairly winding, although some curves were straightened in the 1970s when container traffic began using the road, most notably the series of bends in Thistleton at the B5269 turnings to Singleton and Elswick. These were notoriously known as 'Hellfire Corner'.

The road meets the A586 Garstang New Road near Larbreck, where it turns west, sharing with the A586 for one mile (1.6 km), until a traffic light controlled junction at Little Singleton. It continues north-west as Mains Lane for a further , passing the A588 turning to Shard Bridge and Over Wyre, then sharing with the A588 until Skippool, where the A588 diverts south-west towards Poulton-le-Fylde. The River Wyre Roundabout at Skippool was removed in 2021 as part of a revamp of Amounderness Way.

At this point, the road becomes Amounderness Way, which was built in the 1970s to allow container traffic to bypass Thornton. It continues through Norcross Roundabout, initially as a national speed limit road until Cleveleys, at which point the speed limit is reduced due to more urban surroundings. The road continues north, acting as a border between Thornton and Cleveleys.

Broadwater Roundabout is surmounted by a statue of Eros, a copy of that standing in Piccadilly Circus, London. From here, the road begins its last and newest section, a  stretch of Amounderness Way built on the old railway bed in the 1990s. It eventually terminates at the new Ash Street roundabout, near Fleetwood Freeport, where it joins the A587

Future 
Work is currently in progress to build a 2.5 mile (4.0 km) dual carriageway to bypass the heavily congested junctions with the A586 at Little Singleton and the A588 at Shard Road. The bypass is due to open in early 2023.

References 

Roads in England
Roads in Lancashire
A585 road